A. F. M. Abdur Rahman (born 5 July 1951) is a retired justice of the High Court Division of the Supreme Court of Bangladesh. He was elevated to the High Court Division as additional judge on 27 April 2003, and was confirmed as a permanent judge on 27 April 2005 by then President of Bangladesh Iajuddin Ahmed. Rahman retired from the bench on 4 July 2018.

Early life and education
Rahman was born on 5 July 1951 in East Bengal, Dominion of Pakistan (now Gazaria Upazila, Munshiganj District, Bangladesh) to Dr. Abdul Gaffer Khan and Mosammat Mohsena Begum.
His primary education was completed from Bat-tala Primary School and from Matiabrooz High School, Calcutta and also from New Paltan Line High School,Azimpur,Dacca. He  passed SSC in the year 1966 from West End High School Azimpur, Dacca and H.SC from Haraganga College Munshiganj.He obtained B,Sc degree from Dhaka College, Dhaka with credit in Mathematics. Later he studied M,SC in Applied Chemistry in the University of Dhaka.
He earned an LLB degree from Central Law College, Dhaka in 1977, and obtained a second LLB with honors from the University of London..He was called to the English Bar as a Barrister-at-Law on 26 July 2001 as member of Lincoln's Inn UK. He further obtained LLM degree on the same year from Dublin University, California, USA.

Career
Rahman was enrolled as an advocate of the District Court on 3 February 1979, the High Court Division on 16 September 1982, and the Appellate Division of the Supreme Court of Bangladesh on 14 January 2000. He describes his field of practice as civil law, banking law, admiralty law, company matters, writ petitions, and arbitration.

He was elevated to the High Court Division as an additional judge on 27 April 2003, and was confirmed as a permanent judge on 27 April 2005. He retired from the bench on 4 July 2018.

Rahman returned back to legal practice in the year 2019 and enrolled as Senior Advocate in the Appellate Division of the Supreme Court of Bangladesh.

References

Bangladeshi barristers
Living people
Alumni of the University of London
Supreme Court of Bangladesh justices
1951 births
20th-century Bangladeshi lawyers
21st-century Bangladeshi lawyers